Marvin Hammond (23 October 1926 – 14 June 2003) was a Canadian rower. He competed in the men's eight event at the 1948 Summer Olympics.

References

1926 births
2003 deaths
Canadian male rowers
Olympic rowers of Canada
Rowers at the 1948 Summer Olympics
Rowers from Hamilton, Ontario